Order of the Leopard may refer to:
Order of the Leopard (Bophuthatswana)

See also
National Order of the Leopard, Democratic Republic of the Congo